This is a list of notable Anglican bishops who converted to the Catholic Church. 

A broad definition of 'Anglican' is employed here, including churches within the Anglican Communion,  but also those of the Continuing Anglican movement which formed following controversy over various actual or proposed theological and doctrinal reforms, such as the ordination of women. These reforms have reportedly spurred on individual bishops to leave their own churches to join the Catholic Church

References 

Lists of Anglican bishops and archbishops